Stenomeria is a genus of plants in the family Apocynaceae, first described as a genus in 1852. It is native to northwestern South America.

Species
 Stenomeria decalepis Turcz. - Colombia  
 Stenomeria fosteri Morillo - Peru 
 Stenomeria pentalepis Turcz. - Ecuador, Colombia, Bolivia  
 Stenomeria tomentosa Rusby - Colombia

References

Asclepiadoideae
Apocynaceae genera
Taxa named by Nikolai Turczaninow